Livid may refer to:
 Livid (color), dark bluish-grey color, such as in livor mortis
 Livid (rapper), in Danish band Kaliber

Music
 Livid (festival), an Australian alternative rock music festival
 Livid (rapper), Danish rapper member of Danish rap band Kaliber
 Livid (Blondie album), 2000
 Livid (Nightmare album), 2004

Others
 LiViD, former mailing list about video playback on Linux
 Livid (film), a 2011 French film
 Livid (clothing company), a Norwegian jeans clothing company